Outhgill is a hamlet in Mallerstang, Cumbria, England.

It is the main hamlet in the dale of Mallerstang (a civil parish) which retains the Norse pattern of its original settlement: a series of small hamlets and isolated houses, with no village centre. In the 19th century, as the main hamlet at the centre of the dale, Outhgill had an inn, a post office, a smithy, the parish church and a Methodist chapel. Of these, only the church survives.

St Mary's Church was founded by Lady Ideonea de Veteripont in the 14th century (possibly 1311) but was restored, in fact more or less rebuilt, in 1663 by Lady Anne Clifford, as the plaque above the door relates. The simple, dignified interior contains an 18th-century font, a faded coat of arms of Lady Anne from the year she restored the church, a set of shelves that used to hold the loaves of bread distributed weekly under Middleton's Charity, and kneelers embroidered by ladies of the dale. The stained glass windows all date from Victorian times or later.

In the churchyard there are the unmarked graves of 25 of the builders of the Mallerstang section of the Settle-Carlisle Railway, and members of their families, who died during the construction of the line. A monument to them, marking the area where they are buried, was dedicated in 1997.

Almost opposite the church is the former Wesleyan Chapel, built in 1878. There are about a dozen houses, including one where the father of the great scientist Michael Faraday was the blacksmith in the late 18th century (moving to London in the year Michael was born).

The old pinfold contains a sculpture by Andy Goldsworthy.  
There is a replica of the "Jew Stone" on the village green. The original monument was set up by the rather eccentric William Mounsey in 1850 on Black Fell Moss below Hugh Seat, to mark the source of the River Eden. It got its name from the inscriptions in Greek and Hebrew.

 

See also

Listed buildings in Mallerstang

References
Hamilton, John  Mallerstang Dale, Broadcast Books, 1993 (reprinted 1999)

External links

Mallerstang Dale webpage
Sheepfolds & Pinfolds - Cumbrian sculpture project by Andy Goldsworthy
Outhgill Village

Hamlets in Cumbria
Eden District
Mallerstang